Cannot Live Without You is a 2009 Taiwanese film directed by Leon Dai, a professional Taiwanese actor. It was his second film as a director.  This film was also selected as the official entry for 82nd Academy Awards for Best Foreign Language Film.  Dai also acted as the co-screenwriter and editor of the film.

Cannot Live Without You was filmed entirely in black and white in digital format, then transferred to film for distribution. The film has a somewhat unconventional structure, beginning at the halfway point. It is based on a true story.

Plot
The story concerns a poor Hakka dock worker Li Wu Hsiung fighting to reclaim the custody of his seven-year-old girl. Unsuccessful and clinging to the faithful daughter, he threatens to jump off a bridge.

As the film progresses, Li (played by the movie's co-screenwriter and first-time actor Akira Chen) gets embroiled in bureaucratic red tape and does all he can to get his daughter back from government institutional care.

Awards and nominations
46th Golden Horse Awards
 Won: Best Film
 Won: Best Director (Leon Dai)
 Won: Best Original Screenplay (Leon Dai and Akira Chen)
 Won: The Outstanding Taiwanese Film of the Year
 Nominated: Best Actor (Akira Chen)
 Nominated: Best New Performer (Akira Chen)
 Nominated: Best Art Direction (HuaTa-Hua)
 Nominated: Best Editing (Leon Dai)
Asia-Pacific Film Festival
 Won: Best Director (Leon Dai)
 Won: Best cinematography (Chang Hsiang-yi)
Macau International Movie Festival 
 Won: Best Film
40th International Film Festival of India
 Won: Golden Peacock (Best Film)
Durban International Film Festival
 Won: Best Feature Film
Vesoul International Film Festival of Asian Cinema
 Won: Best Film

References

External links
 

2009 films
Taiwanese drama films
Films whose director won the Best Director Golden Horse Award